Jhonatan Werpajoski Umbacia (born 7 April 1988) is a Colombian former professional footballer who played as a defender.

References

External links
 
Profile at GolGolGol.net

1988 births
Living people
Colombian footballers
Association football defenders
Once Caldas footballers
Boyacá Chicó F.C. footballers
La Equidad footballers